A by-election was held for the Australian House of Representatives seat of Chisholm on 19 September 1970. This was triggered by the death of Liberal Party MP Wilfrid Kent Hughes.

The by-election was won by Liberal candidate Tony Staley.

Results

References

1970 elections in Australia
Victorian federal by-elections
1970s in Victoria (Australia)
September 1970 events in Australia